Brus is a town and municipality located in the Rasina District of southern Serbia. According to the 2011 census, the population of the town is 4,572, while the population of the municipality is 16,293. The city is surrounded by hills on three levels, where the lowest one is a place where the Grasevka river firths into the Rasina river. On the upper level of the town, a fountain of medicinal mineral water is located.

History
From 1929 to 1941, Brus was part of the Morava Banovina of the Kingdom of Yugoslavia.

Settlements
Aside from the town of Brus, the municipality consists of the following villages:

Demographics

According to the 2011 census results, the municipality of Brus has a population of 16,317 inhabitants.

Economy
The following table gives a preview of total number of registered people employed in legal entities per their core activity (as of 2018):

Twin cities
  Berovo, North Macedonia

References

External links 

 
 Torusim Organization of Brus 

Populated places in Rasina District
Municipalities and cities of Šumadija and Western Serbia